The 2002 Marshall Thundering Herd football team represented Marshall University in the 2002 NCAA Division I-A football season. The Thundering Herd played their home games at Marshall University Stadium in Huntington, West Virginia, and competed in the East Division of the Mid-American Conference (MAC). The team was coached by seventh-year head coach Bob Pruett. Marshall won its fifth MAC title in six years and its fifth consecutive bowl game.

Schedule

Game summaries

Appalachian State

Virginia Tech

UCF

Kent State

Buffalo

Troy State

Central Michigan

Akron

Miami (OH)

While Stan Hill and his Marshall teammates were celebrating a dramatic win, Miami (Ohio) defensive coordinator John Wauford was being led off the field in handcuffs by state police.

Moments after Hill scored on a 1-yard run with 5 seconds left for a 36-34 victory Tuesday night, Wauford allegedly shoved a Marshall fan and was arrested. The fan, Robert A. Flaugher of Pickerington, Ohio, hit his head on the artificial turf and was taken on a stretcher to a hospital with a concussion, according to a report filed by State Police in Huntington. Flaugher was in stable condition at St. Mary's Medical Center, said a nursing supervisor who did not want her name released.

Wauford was charged with battery, a misdemeanor. He was transported to Cabell County Magistrate Court and posted bail. The amount wasn't immediately released. Miami officials refused to comment on the incident, and did not make players or coaches available to media.

Marshall fans stormed the field after Stan Hill's winning score. Playing in place of the injured Byron Leftwich and making his first career start, Hill also threw four touchdown passes.

Ben Roethlisberger twice brought Miami back from double-digit deficits, and Luke Clemens' 17-yard TD run gave the RedHawks a 34-29 lead with 6:33 left.

After a dropped pass in the end zone by Darius Watts - who caught three TD passes from Hill - a pair of interference calls against Miami put the ball at the 1, setting up Hill's run.

External link: http://www.muredhawks.com/sports/m-footbl/recaps/111202aaa.html

Ohio

Ball State

Toledo

A month's worth of limping on a sore shin didn't deter Byron Leftwich, and neither did getting flattened by Toledo's David Gardner. Leftwich got up from the third-quarter hit to throw two late touchdowns, including a 40-yarder to Darius Watts with 49 seconds left, as Marshall beat the Rockets 49-45 in the Mid-American Conference championship game.

Marshall atoned for a loss at Toledo in the 2001 championship game, in which the Rockets overcame a 23-0 deficit to win 41-36.

Leftwich completed 32 of 42 passes for 404 yards and four TDs to overshadow the four rushing touchdowns by Toledo redshirt freshman Trinity Dawson, who finished with a career-high 130 yards. Leftwich became the conference's all-time leading passer with 11,654, surpassing the 11,299 yards set by Tim Lester from 1996 to 1999.

External link: http://sports.espn.go.com/ncf/recap?gameId=223410276

Louisville

Roster

Team players drafted in the NFL
The following players were selected in the 2003 NFL Draft.

Rankings

References

Marshall
Marshall Thundering Herd football seasons
Mid-American Conference football champion seasons
LendingTree Bowl champion seasons
Marshall Thundering Herd football